The Japanese Federation of Textile, Chemical, Commerce, Food and General Services Workers' Unions (UA Zensen) is a trade union representing workers in various sectors in Japan.

History
The union was founded on 6 November 2012, with merger of the Japanese Federation of Textile, Chemical, Food, Commercial, Service and General Workers' Unions and the Japan Federation of Service and Distributive Workers' Unions.  Like both its predecessors, it affiliated to the Japanese Trade Union Confederation.  It was the largest industrial trade union in the country, with 1,641,955 on formation, and by 2020, this had grown to 1,790,000 members.

Presidents
2012: Naoto Ohmi
2016: Akihiko Matsuura

External links

References

Textile and clothing trade unions
Trade unions established in 2012
Trade unions in Japan